KXTR-LP (100.7 FM) is a noncommercial college radio station licensed to Tarleton State University in Stephenville, Texas. KXTR-LP broadcasts to the city of Stephenville and the surrounding area, covering more than half of Erath County.  Rock music classic and modern is played most hours, while hip-hop and rap are played at late hours and overnight. Programming also includes educational programming and genre-specific programs aired by students and faculty.

KXTR-LP and its sister station, KTRL 90.5 FM, are operated by students of Tarleton State University out of the radio station located in the Mathematics building on the TSU campus. KXTR-LP's programming is run entirely by student staff and volunteer DJs. Students of all majors work together to run the technical and music aspects of the station.

Tarleton State University is one of four universities in the state of Texas to own and operate two radio stations, the other institutions being the University of Texas at Austin, Texas Tech University, and the University of Houston.

References

External links
 KXTR-LP Official Website
 

XTR-LP
XTR-LP
Tarleton State University